Oybek Mamazulunov is an amateur boxer from Uzbekistan. He won the gold medal at the 2013 Asian Amateur Boxing Championships after defeating Adilbek Niyazymbetov of Kazakhstan. He also reached the semifinals of the 2013 AIBA World Boxing Championships and thus secured a medal for his country.

References

Living people
Asian Games medalists in boxing
Boxers at the 2014 Asian Games
Uzbekistani male boxers
AIBA World Boxing Championships medalists
Asian Games bronze medalists for Uzbekistan
Medalists at the 2014 Asian Games
Year of birth missing (living people)
Light-heavyweight boxers
21st-century Uzbekistani people